Neaua  is a commune in Mureș County, Transylvania, Romania composed of five villages:
Ghinești / Geges
Neaua
Rigmani /  Rigmány
Sânsimion / Nyárádszentsimon
Vădaș / Vadasd

Demographics
The commune has an absolute Székely Hungarian majority. According to the 2011 census, it has a population of 1,369, of which 89.4% are Hungarian and 7.5% are Roma.

Natives
József Madaras

See also
 List of Hungarian exonyms (Mureș County)

References

Communes in Mureș County
Localities in Transylvania